Massachusetts House of Representatives' 13th Essex district in the United States is one of 160 legislative districts included in the lower house of the Massachusetts General Court. It covers part of Essex County. Democrat Ted Speliotis of Danvers has represented the district since 1997. He plans to retire after 2020. Candidates for this district seat in the 2020 Massachusetts general election include former rep Sally Kerans.

Locales represented
The district includes the following localities:
 Danvers
 part of Middleton
 part of Peabody

The current district geographic boundary overlaps with those of the Massachusetts Senate's 1st Essex and Middlesex and 2nd Essex districts.

Former locale
The district previously covered part of Salem, circa 1872.

Representatives
 Joseph W. Abbott, circa 1858 
 Dean Peabody, circa 1859 
 Francis Taylor Berry, circa 1888 
 Vernon Wynne Evans, circa 1920 
 Tony A. Garofano, circa 1920 
 Daniel J. Hayden, circa 1920 
 Harriet Russell Hart
 Frank Edwin Boot, circa 1951 
 Michael Joseph Carroll, circa 1951 
 Richard James White, Jr., circa 1951 
 Henry A. Walker, circa 1975 
 John E. Murphy, Jr.
 Peter G. Torkildsen
 Sally Kerans
 Theodore C. Speliotis
 Sally Kerans, 2021 - present

See also
 List of Massachusetts House of Representatives elections
 Other Essex County districts of the Massachusetts House of Representatives: 1st, 2nd, 3rd, 4th, 5th, 6th, 7th, 8th, 9th, 10th, 11th, 12th, 14th, 15th, 16th, 17th, 18th
 Essex County districts of the Massachusett Senate: 1st, 2nd, 3rd; 1st Essex and Middlesex; 2nd Essex and Middlesex
 List of Massachusetts General Courts
 List of former districts of the Massachusetts House of Representatives

Images

References

External links
 Ballotpedia
  (State House district information based on U.S. Census Bureau's American Community Survey).
 League of Women Voters of Topsfield-Boxford-Middleton

House
Government of Essex County, Massachusetts